Prais may refer to:

Luis Prais (1925-2005), Uruguayan footballer
Sigbert Prais (1928–2014), British economist
Prais–Winsten estimation, statistical method in econometrics
Prais, literary pseudonym of Afrikan Spir (1837–1890), Russian philosopher
Prai people

See also
Prai (disambiguation)
Praise (disambiguation)